Pseudopostega brachybasis is a moth of the family Opostegidae. It was described by Donald R. Davis and Jonas R. Stonis, 2007. It is known from the state of Tamaulipas in north-eastern Mexico.

The length of the forewings is 2.3–2.6 mm. Adults have been recorded in August.

Etymology
The species name is derived from the Greek brachys (meaning short) and basis (meaning foundation, pedestal), in reference to the extremely short base of the male gnathos.

References

Opostegidae
Moths described in 2007